HD 32450, also known as Gliese 185 is a binary star in the constellation Lepus. It is located about 28 light years from the Solar System. This star will make its closest approach to the Sun in roughly 350,000 years, when it comes within .

See also
 List of star systems within 25–30 light-years

References

Durchmusterung objects
0185
023455
032450
Lepus (constellation)
K-type main-sequence stars
Binary stars